Csapó is a surname of Hungarian origin. Notable people with the surname include:

Gábor Csapó (1950–2022), Hungarian water polo player
Gabriella Csapó-Fekete (born 1954), Hungarian volleyball player
Géza Csapó (1950–2022), Hungarian sprint canoeist
Károly Csapó (born 1952), Hungarian footballer

Hungarian-language surnames